Peptides are short chains of amino acids linked by peptide bonds. A polypeptide is a longer, continuous, unbranched peptide chain. Polypeptides which have a molecular mass of 10,000 Da or more are called proteins. Chains of fewer than twenty amino acids are called oligopeptides, and include dipeptides, tripeptides, and tetrapeptides.

Peptides fall under the broad chemical classes of biological polymers and oligomers, alongside nucleic acids, oligosaccharides, polysaccharides, and others.

Proteins consist of one or more polypeptides arranged in a biologically functional way, often bound to ligands such as coenzymes and cofactors, to another protein or other macromolecule such as DNA or RNA, or to complex macromolecular assemblies.

Amino acids that have been incorporated into peptides are termed residues. A water molecule is released during formation of each amide bond. All peptides except cyclic peptides have an N-terminal (amine group) and C-terminal (carboxyl group) residue at the end of the peptide (as shown for the tetrapeptide in the image).

Classes
There are numerous types of peptides that have been classified according to their sources and functions. According to the Handbook of Biologically Active Peptides, some groups of peptides include plant peptides, bacterial/antibiotic peptides, fungal peptides, invertebrate peptides, amphibian/skin peptides, venom peptides, cancer/anticancer peptides, vaccine peptides, immune/inflammatory peptides, brain peptides, endocrine peptides, ingestive peptides, gastrointestinal peptides, cardiovascular peptides, renal peptides, respiratory peptides, opioid peptides, neurotrophic peptides, and blood–brain peptides.

Some ribosomal peptides are subject to proteolysis. These function, typically in higher organisms, as hormones and signaling molecules. Some microbes produce peptides as antibiotics, such as microcins and bacteriocins.

Peptides frequently have post-translational modifications such as phosphorylation, hydroxylation, sulfonation, palmitoylation, glycosylation, and disulfide formation. In general, peptides are linear, although lariat structures have been observed. More exotic manipulations do occur, such as racemization of L-amino acids to D-amino acids in platypus venom.

Nonribosomal peptides are assembled by enzymes, not the ribosome. A common non-ribosomal peptide is glutathione, a component of the antioxidant defenses of most aerobic organisms. Other nonribosomal peptides are most common in unicellular organisms, plants, and fungi and are synthesized by modular enzyme complexes called nonribosomal peptide synthetases.

These complexes are often laid out in a similar fashion, and they can contain many different modules to perform a diverse set of chemical manipulations on the developing product. These peptides are often cyclic and can have highly complex cyclic structures, although linear nonribosomal peptides are also common. Since the system is closely related to the machinery for building fatty acids and polyketides, hybrid compounds are often found. The presence of oxazoles or thiazoles often indicates that the compound was synthesized in this fashion.

 are derived from animal milk or meat digested by proteolysis. In addition to containing small peptides, the resulting material includes fats, metals, salts, vitamins, and many other biological compounds. Peptones are used in nutrient media for growing bacteria and fungi.

Peptide fragments refer to fragments of proteins that are used to identify or quantify the source protein. Often these are the products of enzymatic degradation performed in the laboratory on a controlled sample, but can also be forensic or paleontological samples that have been degraded by natural effects.

Chemical synthesis

Example families
The peptide families in this section are ribosomal peptides, usually with hormonal activity. All of these peptides are synthesized by cells as longer "propeptides" or "proproteins" and truncated prior to exiting the cell. They are released into the bloodstream where they perform their signaling functions.

Antimicrobial peptides
 Magainin family
 Cecropin family
 Cathelicidin family
 Defensin family

Tachykinin peptides

 Substance P
 Kassinin
 Neurokinin A
 Eledoisin
 Neurokinin B

Vasoactive intestinal peptides

 VIP (Vasoactive Intestinal Peptide; PHM27)
 PACAP Pituitary Adenylate Cyclase Activating Peptide
 Peptide PHI 27 (Peptide Histidine Isoleucine 27)
 GHRH 1-24 (Growth Hormone Releasing Hormone 1-24)
 Glucagon
 Secretin

Pancreatic polypeptide-related peptides
 NPY (NeuroPeptide Y)
 PYY (Peptide YY) APP (Avian Pancreatic Polypeptide) PPY Pancreatic PolYpeptideOpioid peptides

 Proopiomelanocortin (POMC) peptides
 Enkephalin pentapeptides
 Prodynorphin peptides

Calcitonin peptides
 Calcitonin
 Amylin
 AGG01

Self-assembling peptides
 Aromatic short peptides
 Biomimetic peptides
 Peptide amphiphiles
Peptide dendrimers

Other peptides
 B-type Natriuretic Peptide (BNP) - produced in the myocardium and useful in medical diagnosis
 Lactotripeptides - Lactotripeptides might reduce blood pressure, although the evidence is mixed.
 Peptidic components from traditional Chinese medicine Colla Corii Asini in hematopoiesis.

Terminology

 Length 
Several terms related to peptides have no strict length definitions, and there is often overlap in their usage:
 A polypeptide is a single linear chain of many amino acids (any length), held together by amide bonds.
 A protein consists of one or more polypeptides (more than about 50 amino acids long).
 An oligopeptide consists of only a few amino acids (between two and twenty).

 Number of amino acids 

Peptides and proteins are often described by the number of amino acids in their chain, e.g. a protein with 158 amino acids may be described as a "158 amino-acid-long protein".
Peptides of specific shorter lengths are named using IUPAC numerical multiplier prefixes:
 A monopeptide has one amino acid.
 A dipeptide has two amino acids.
 A tripeptide has three amino acids.
 A tetrapeptide has four amino acids.
 A pentapeptide has five amino acids. (e.g., enkephalin).
 A hexapeptide has six amino acids. (e.g., angiotensin IV).
 A heptapeptide has seven amino acids. (e.g., spinorphin).
 An octapeptide has eight amino acids (e.g., angiotensin II).
 A nonapeptide has nine amino acids (e.g., oxytocin).
 A decapeptide has ten amino acids (e.g., gonadotropin-releasing hormone and angiotensin I).
 A undecapeptide has eleven amino acids (e.g., substance P).

The same words are also used to describe a group of residues in a larger polypeptide (e.g., RGD motif).

 Function 
 A neuropeptide is a peptide that is active in association with neural tissue.
 A lipopeptide is a peptide that has a lipid connected to it, and pepducins are lipopeptides that interact with GPCRs.
 A peptide hormone is a peptide that acts as a hormone.
 A proteose is a mixture of peptides produced by the hydrolysis of proteins. The term is somewhat archaic.
 A peptidergic agent (or drug) is a chemical which functions to directly modulate the peptide systems in the body or brain. An example is opioidergics, which are neuropeptidergics.
 A cell-penetrating peptide is a peptide able to penetrate the cell membrane.

See also

Acetyl hexapeptide-3
 Beefy meaty peptide
Collagen hybridizing peptide, a short peptide that can bind to denatured collagen in tissues
 Bis-peptide
 CLE peptide
 Epidermal growth factor
 Journal of Peptide Science''
 Lactotripeptides
 Micropeptide
 Multifunctional peptide
 Neuropeptide
 Palmitoyl pentapeptide-4
 Pancreatic hormone
 peptide spectral library
 Peptide synthesis
 Peptidomimetics (such as peptoids and β-peptides)  to peptides, but with different properties.
 Protein tag, describing addition of peptide sequences to enable protein isolation or detection
 Replikins
 Ribosome
 Translation (biology)

References

Peptides